Lewis Wilkieson Johnstone (10 April 1862 – 9 March 1936) was a Conservative member of the House of Commons of Canada. He was born in Sydney, Nova Scotia and became a physician and surgeon.

Johnstone was the grandson of Edmund Murray Dodd (1797–1876), who represented Sydney, Nova Scotia in the Nova Scotia House of Assembly and served as a Judge in the Supreme Court of Nova Scotia. He was also a descendant of David Mathews, the Loyalist Mayor of New York City under the British during the American Revolution. He was a descendant of the Schuyler family.

Johnstone attended King's College at Windsor, Nova Scotia, then in 1886 graduated in medicine from Bellevue Hospital Medical College. He became a municipal councillor and mayor of Sydney Mines.

He was first elected to Parliament at the Cape Breton North—Victoria riding in the 1925 general election then re-elected there in 1926 and 1930. Johnstone was defeated in the 1935 election by Daniel Alexander Cameron of the Liberal party.

References

External links
 

1862 births
1936 deaths
Canadian people of Dutch descent
Physicians from Nova Scotia
Conservative Party of Canada (1867–1942) MPs
Mayors of places in Nova Scotia
Members of the House of Commons of Canada from Nova Scotia
Nova Scotia municipal councillors
Schuyler family